Zouhair El Moutaraji (born 1 April 1996) is a Moroccan professional footballer who plays for Wydad AC as a winger.

Career
El Moutaraji started his career with Wydad AC at the age of 18 as a replacement for the injured Reda Hajhouj. He was linked with a move to Italy's Juventus as a junior, but the move never materialised.

In 2017, El Moutaraji was loaned to Olympique Club de Khouribga, where he scored ten league goals, including one against Wydad. He finished tied for fifth in the league goalscoring table.

El Moutaraji returned to Wydad after his loan spell and played several games for them in the 2018–19 CAF Champions League, scoring goals against Horoya and ASEC Mimosas. On 30 May 2022, El Moutaraji scored a brace for Wydad in a 2–0 win over Al Ahly in the 2022 CAF Champions League Final, and won the man of the match award.

Honours
Wydad AC
 Botola: 2014–15, 2018–19, 2020–21, 2021–22 
 CAF Champions League: 2021–22

Individuale
 CAF Champions League Goal of the Year: 2021–22
 Wydad AC Goal of the Year: 2021–22

References

External links
Soccerway

1996 births
Living people
Footballers from Casablanca
Moroccan footballers
Wydad AC players
Hassania Agadir players
Olympique Club de Khouribga players
Botola players
Association football wingers